Clomegestone (INN), or clomagestone, also known as 6-chloro-17α-hydroxy-16α-methylpregna-4,6-diene-3,20-dione, is a steroidal progestin of the 17α-hydroxyprogesterone group that was never marketed. An acetate ester, clomegestone acetate, also exists, and similarly was never marketed.

References

Organochlorides
Pregnanes
Progestogens
Abandoned drugs